The Kia Retona is a small mini SUV based on Kia's military jeeps. The name is a portmanteau of return to nature. Developed by Asia Motors, the car was initially sold as the "Asia Retona" in some markets. The Retona had been using the same platform as the first generation Kia Sportage Convertible. Its competitors included the Lada Niva, Suzuki Jimny and the SsangYong Korando.

A 2006 survey of German owners by magazine Auto Bild found that the Retona was "abysmally" unreliable.

References

Retona
Mini sport utility vehicles
2000s cars
Cars introduced in 1998